Julia Drusilla (born AD 38) was a daughter of Herod Agrippa, King of Judaea and Cypros and the sister of Berenice, Mariamne and Herod Agrippa II. Her son, Agrippa, was one of the few people known by name to have died in the Vesuvius eruption.

Life

First marriage
Her father had betrothed her to Gaius Julius Archelaus Antiochus Epiphanes, first son of King Antiochus IV of Commagene, with a stipulation from her father that Epiphanes should embrace the Jewish religion, but the marriage had still not been contracted on her father's death at Caesarea Maritima in 44. According to Josephus, on Agrippa's death, the populace "cast such reproaches upon the deceased as are not fit to be spoken of; and so many of them as were then soldiers, which were a great number, went to his house, and hastily carried off the statues of [Agrippa I]'s daughters, and all at once carried them into the brothels, and when they had set them on the brothel roofs, they abused them to the utmost of their power, and did such things to them as are too indecent to be related".

Once Drusilla's brother, Herod Agrippa II, had been assigned the tetrarchy of Herod Philip I (along with Batanea, Trachonites and Abila) in around 49/50, he broke off her engagement and gave her in marriage to Gaius Julius Azizus, Priest King of Emesa, who had consented to be circumcised.

Marriage to Antonius Felix

It appears that it was shortly after her first marriage was contracted that Antonius Felix, the Roman procurator of Judea, met Drusilla, probably at her brother's court (Berenice, the elder sister, lived with her brother at this time, and it is thought Drusilla did too). Felix was reportedly struck by her great beauty, and determined to make her his (second) wife.  In order to persuade her, a practising Jew, to divorce her husband and marry him, a pagan, he sent an emissary to plead for him.

She was about twenty-two when she appeared at Felix's side, during St. Paul's captivity at Caesarea – the Book of Acts 24:24 reports that "Several days later Felix came [back into court] with his wife Drusilla, who was a Jewess."

The Book of Acts gives no further information on her subsequent life, but Josephus states that they had a son named Marcus Antonius Agrippa. Their son perished with most of the populations of Pompeii and Herculaneum in the AD 79 eruption of Mount Vesuvius. Josephus says "σὺν τῇ γυναικὶ", which has been interpreted as "with his wife", or alternatively "with the woman", namely Drusilla.

See also
List of biblical figures identified in extra-biblical sources

Notes

References

Jews and Judaism in the Roman Empire
Herodian dynasty
Emesene dynasty
38 births
People in Acts of the Apostles
Women in the New Testament
Deaths in volcanic eruptions
1st-century people
Julii